Garfield School District Re-2 is a school district headquartered in Rifle, Colorado. It includes municipalities and areas in the western portion of Garfield County. In addition to Rifle it includes New Castle and Silt.

 it had almost 800 employees and 4,700 students.

Schools
 High schools
 Coal Ridge High School
 Rifle High School

 Middle schools
 Rifle Middle School
 Riverside Middle School

 Elementary schools
 Cactus Valley Elementary School
 Elk Creek Elementary School
 Graham Mesa Elementary School
 Highland Elementary School
 Kathryn Senor Elementary School
 Wamsley Elementary School

 Famous Attendees
 Lauren Opal Boebert

References

External links
 Garfield Re-2 School District

School districts in Colorado
Education in Garfield County, Colorado